Campiglossa lingens is a species of tephritid or fruit flies in the genus Campiglossa of the family Tephritidae.

Distribution
The species is found in Austria.

References

Tephritinae
Insects described in 1869
Taxa named by Hermann Loew
Diptera of Europe